Claude Nau or Claude Nau de la Boisseliere (d. 1605) was a confidential secretary of Mary, Queen of Scots, in England from 1575 to 1586. He was involved in coding Mary's letters with cipher keys.

Career
Nau was a successful lawyer practicing in Paris. He was recruited by the Guise family in 1574 to be Mary's secretary. Jean de Champhuon, sieur du Ruisseau, who married Nau's sister Claire in 1563, also joined Mary's service. An account of the death of Mary, Queen of Scots, mentions that Ruisseau was Claude Nau's brother-in-law, a beau frere, and Albert Fontenay was Claude Nau's half brother.

Nau was presented by the Duke of Guise, Mary's nephew, to Henry III of France. The King gave him diplomatic accreditation and sent him to Elizabeth I of England. Elizabeth gave him a letter of introduction to the Earl of Shrewsbury the Scottish Queen's keeper at Sheffield Castle. Nau was frequently mentioned in Mary's correspondence, and many of his own letters survive.

In August 1577 Nau added a postscript to one of Mary's letters to her ally in France, James Beaton, Archbishop of Glasgow, that he intended to send him the queen's portrait, but the painter working at Sheffield Castle had not completed the work to perfection.

Negotiations in Scotland
In June 1579, Mary sent Nau as her ambassador to her son, James VI of Scotland, instead of John Lesley, Bishop of Ross. However, the Scottish court at Stirling Castle would not allow him an audience, apparently because Mary's letter was addressed to her son, not the King. Although Nau was accompanied by Nicolas Errington, Provost Marshal of Berwick upon Tweed, he had no papers from Elizabeth. The Privy Council of Scotland issued a proclamation that he deserved punishment and should be commanded to depart.

Claude's brother-in-law, the Sieur de Fontenay, sent from France, had more success. Fontenay was able to meet James VI in August 1584. Fontenay wrote to Claude about his good reception, James had met him in his cabinet at Holyroodhouse, and lent him a horse to join the hunting. In November 1584, Nau spoke with Elizabeth, on the subject of Mary's allegations against Bess of Hardwick.

Pierrepont
Nau had a relationship with a young woman in Mary's household, Elizabeth Pierrepont. In April 1586 he sent a friend to discuss marriage with her father Henry Pierrepont. Mary was in favour of her marriage, but it seems her father had other ideas and removed her from the household.

Cipher codes and the Babington Plot
Nau and another secretary Gilbert Curle were arrested at Chartley in 1586. They were escorted to London by Thomas Gorges. He seems to have lived comfortably with the family of Francis Walsingham in London. Jérôme Pasquier, a servant who coded Mary's letters, was also arrested. Pasquier was questioned in the Tower of London about the Babington Plot and the writing of cipher codes in Mary's household. He told Thomas Phelippes that Nau kept the alphabets and cipher keys. Pasquier usually did his cipher work in Nau's chamber. Mary kept the letters in cipher herself.

Francis Walsingham sent news to the Scottish Court in September 1586 that Mary was to be moved to Fotheringhay, and that "the matters whereof she is guilty are already so plain and manifest (being also confessed by her two secretaries), as it is thought, they shall required no long debating".

After Mary's execution Nau returned to France where he was exonerated from accusations of treachery to Mary by the King and the Duke of Guise.

Works
Joseph Stevenson discovered Nau's memoirs of Mary and her history and published these works in 1883.  Stevenson also attributed a treatise in French on Mary's title to the English throne to Nau.

Nau wrote a history of the years 1542 to 1545 which describes Regent Arran taking power in Scotland, possession of Holyroodhouse and Falkland Palace, and the exchequer. He describes the burning of Edinburgh in May 1544. He tells a story, also found in John Lesley's History of Scotland, of the banquet for the Patriarch of Venice, where a buffet laden with Venetian glass was deliberately tipped over to impress the envoy with an idea of Scotland's material wealth.

Nau started translating John Lesley's Latin history of Scotland, the De Origine, into French. He did not complete this historical work.

Further reading
 Stevenson, Joseph, S.J., ed., The History of Mary Stewart, by Claude Nau (Edinburgh, 1883).

References

1605 deaths
Court of Mary, Queen of Scots
16th-century French people
French expatriates in England
Year of birth unknown